The 2021 Florida Cup is the seventh edition of Florida Cup, a friendly association football tournament played in the United States. It was contested from July 25 to 28. Due to the COVID-19 pandemic, the tournament was scheduled for July instead of January. 

The teams originally scheduled for the tournament were English clubs Everton and Arsenal, Italian club Inter Milan and Colombian club Millonarios. On July 20, Arsenal announced their withdrawal due to positive COVID-19 tests among their coaching staff, and Inter Milan withdrew citing concerns over rising COVID-19 cases in Florida. 

Mexican side UNAM and Colombian club Atlético Nacional were added to the schedule to face Everton and Millonarios for their second match on a July 28 doubleheader. It was decided that the winner of the opening match between Everton and Millonarios would be declared winner of the tournament.  Everton defeated Millonarios 10–9 on penalties after a 1–1 draw.

Teams

Standings

Matches

References

External links

2021
2021 in American soccer
July 2021 sports events in the United States
2021 in sports in Florida